Dulwich College International may refer to:

Dulwich College Beijing
Dulwich College Seoul
Dulwich College Shanghai
Dulwich College Singapore
Dulwich College Suzhou
Dulwich International High School Suzhou
Dulwich International High School Zhuhai

Dulwich College